Shaftalustan (also Romanized as Shaftālūstān and Shaftālestān; also known as Qal‘eh-ye Shaftālestān) is a village in Naharjan Rural District, Mud District, Sarbisheh County, South Khorasan Province, Iran. At the 2006 census, its population was 13, in 5 families.

References 

Populated places in Sarbisheh County